Lezioni di violoncello con toccata e fuga is a 1976 commedia sexy all'italiana film. It stars actor Gabriele Ferzetti.

Cast
 Carlo Giuffrè as Count Riccardo
 Marina Malfatti as Stella
 Sandra Mantegna  as The Countess
 Gabriele Ferzetti as Stella's father
 Mario Scaccia  as The Butler
 Christian Borromeo as Stefano
 Leopoldo Trieste
 Luigi Montini

See also    
 List of Italian films of 1976

References

External links

1976 films
1970s Italian-language films
Commedia sexy all'italiana
1970s sex comedy films
1976 comedy films
1970s Italian films